Win a Date with Tad Hamilton! is a 2004 American romantic comedy film directed by Robert Luketic, written by Victor Levin and starring Kate Bosworth, Topher Grace, Josh Duhamel, Gary Cole, Ginnifer Goodwin, Sean Hayes and Nathan Lane. The film follows a small-town girl (Bosworth) who wins a contest for a date with a male celebrity (Duhamel) and a love triangle forms between the girl, the star and the girl's best friend (Grace).

The character's name of Tad Hamilton has been seen as a cross between the names of screen idols Tab Hunter and George Hamilton.

The film received mixed reviews from critics and earned $17.1 million in the United States and $4.2 million overseas for a worldwide total of $21.3 million, making it a commercial failure against a $22 million budget.

Plot
A soldier and nurse emerge from two 1940s-style cars in the middle of the night. As the nurse runs up to the soldier, the camera switches, revealing that this is a film scene.

Rosalee, Cathy, and Pete, Piggly Wiggly store workers in Fraziers Bottom, West Virginia are watching the filming, and as the nurse asks for forgiveness and the soldier agrees, the women in the audience are moved to tears as Pete is clearly unimpressed.

As the ladies wonder what the film's star Tad Hamilton is doing at that moment, Tad is described by his agent as "drinking, driving, smoking, leering, and groping all at the same time."

The agent tells Tad that his hedonism is damaging his reputation and career opportunities. To improve his image and convince a film director to cast him, his agents establish a competition to win a date with Tad, with proceeds benefiting the charity Save the Children. Rosalee finds an online advertisement for the competition.

With the help of the Piggly Wiggly customers and a reluctant Pete, Cathy and Rosalee raise the $100 entrance fee as Pete tells his superior that he will leave for college in Richmond after he talks "with someone about going to Richmond with me."

A news crew arrives outside Rosalee's home because she has won the date with Tad. A despondent Pete accompanies her to the airport. Awed by Los Angeles, Rosalee becomes tongue-tied in Tad's presence. The date does not go well; Rosalee vomits in the limousine, and when Tad mentions his love of animals, which Pete had warned was a signal of sexual intentions, her suspicions are raised. After seeing Tad's house, Rosalee requests to return to the hotel and soon returns home, leaving Tad thoughtful.

Pete is about to tell Rosalee about moving to Richmond when she is surprised by Tad's sudden arrival. Although she is still cynical, when he admits to not having "his priorities straight," she is convinced of his good intentions.

On a phone call with his agent, Tad insists that he wants to turn over a new leaf and won't return to Los Angeles for a while. When he gathers Rosalee for a date, he leaves a positive impression on Rosalee's father, who had studied hard for the encounter. Pete tries to stop their date by reporting them for illegally parking. He tries to convince Rosalee that Tad is using her. Despite all of Pete's efforts, Rosalee and Tad grow close over the next few days.

In a bar, Pete corners Tad in the men's room. After conceding that Rosalee is in love with Tad, Pete tells him that she is more than a "wholesome small town girl" but a wonderful person with "the kind of beauty a guy only sees once." He explains her six smiles that reveal her emotions.

Pete makes Tad swear not to break Rosalee's heart. When Rosalee is in Tad's hotel room, his agents appear and inform him that the director has cast him in the film. Tad is overjoyed and convinces Rosalee to accompany him to Los Angeles by employing Pete's "six smiles" speech.

After a rousing speech about great love by Angelica, a barmaid with a crush on him, Pete rushes to Rosalee's, confessing his love. She is confused and resolves to still travel to California with Tad. On the plane, Tad fails to identify one of Rosalee's smiles and then confesses his lie, prompting her to return home.

Rosalee runs to Piggly Wiggly and to Pete's, where Angelica tells her how Pete feels and that he is going to Richmond to escape his heartbreak. Rosalee then drives furiously toward Richmond to find Pete. In a manner similar to that of the opening scene, Rosalee and Pete exit their cars and Pete asks her to dance.

Cast

 Kate Bosworth as Rosalee Futch
 Topher Grace as Pete Monash
 Josh Duhamel as Tad Hamilton
 Gary Cole as Henry Futch
 Ginnifer Goodwin as Cathy Feely
 Sean Hayes as Richard Levy the Shameless
 Nathan Lane as Richard Levy the Driven
 Kathryn Hahn as Angelica
 Octavia Spencer as Janine
 Amy Smart (cameo) as Nurse Betty
 Stephen Tobolowsky as George Ruddy
 Moon Bloodgood as Gorgeous Woman
  Mary Jo Smith as Sonja
  Joseph Convery as Mickey (Tad's driver)
 Deena Dill as Reporter
 Bob Glouberman as Rosalee's limo driver
 Jay Underwood as Policeman Tom
 Sam Pancake as Hotel Clerk
 Patrick O'Brien as Father Newell
 Willow Bay as herself
  Todd Eckert as Maitre D'
  David Wolrod as Roger Bodger
  Jessy Moss as herself
  Marshall Goodman as himself
  Danny Weissfeld as himself
 Caleb Speir as himself
 Jordana Brewster (uncredited) as Actress (deleted scene)
 Paris Hilton (uncredited) as Heather (deleted scene)
 Bonnie McKee (uncredited) as herself

Reception

Box office
The film opened in 2,711 venues on January 23, 2004 and earned $7,320,066 in its opening weekend, ranking third in the North American box office and second among the week's new releases. The film ultimately grossed $17,071,962 in North America and $4,206,494 internationally for a worldwide total of $21,278,456. Based on a $22 million budget, the film was a box-office bomb.

Critical response
Win a Date with Tad Hamilton! received mixed reviews from critics. On Rotten Tomatoes, the film received a 55% approval rating based on 149 reviews, with an average of 5.60/10. The site's consensus states: "Formulaic romantic comedy works better than it should thanks to a charming cast." Metacritic reports a score of 52 out of 100 based on 35 reviews, indicating "mixed or average reviews".

Roger Ebert criticized the film, noting that Duhamel's character always seems more likeable than Grace's, and that the film spends more time building a romance between Rosalee and Tad rather than between Rosalee and Pete. Bosworth's acting was praised for holding the film together.

Carla Meyer of the San Francisco Chronicle regarded the film as tonally inconsistent in its attempt to be both an old-fashioned romantic comedy and modern (albeit gentle) satire, an example being that the Cathy Feely character wonders if Hamilton is at church and later propositions him.

Writing in The New York Times, Stephen Holden regarded the film's plot as resembling those of the 1950s, "dressed up just enough to seem contemporary." Holden regarded Bosworth's role as the toughest, as she showed Rosalee's "feet-on-the-ground optimism and innate wisdom" easily.

Home media
The film was released on VHS and DVD by DreamWorks Home Entertainment on April 20, 2004. The DVD features 16 deleted scenes. It was released on Blu-ray disc by Paramount Home Entertainment on April 26, 2022.

Soundtrack
 "Superfabulous" - BT featuring Rose McGowan
 "Special" - Wilshire
 "Some Days" - Wheat
 "More Bounce in California" - Soul Kid #1
 "Why Can't I?" - Liz Phair
 "Back to You" - John Mayer
 "Something About You" - Five for Fighting
 "Days Go By" - Jason Wade
 "Leading with My Heart" - Alice Peacock
 "Blue" - The Thorns
 "Waiting" - Kyle Riabko
 "I Won't Go Hollywood" - Bleu
 "Somebody" - Bonnie McKee
 "Shining" - Kristian Leontiou
 "Once Again" - Frankie Jordan
 "Can't Get Enough of Your Love" - Barry White

References

External links

 
 
 
 

2004 films
2004 romantic comedy films
American romantic comedy films
Films scored by Edward Shearmur
Films about actors
Films produced by Lucy Fisher
Films produced by Douglas Wick
Films directed by Robert Luketic
Films set in Los Angeles
Films set in West Virginia
Films shot in West Virginia
DreamWorks Pictures films
Films about fandom
2000s English-language films
2000s American films